The 1997–98 William & Mary Tribe men's basketball team represented the College of William & Mary in intercollegiate basketball during the 1997–98 season. Under the fourth year of head coach Charlie Woollum, the team finished the season 20–7 and 13–3 in the Colonial Athletic Association. William & Mary played its home games at William & Mary Hall. This was the 93rd season of the collegiate basketball program at William & Mary.

William & Mary finished tied for first place in the CAA with UNC Wilmington, clinching just the second regular season conference title for the Tribe and first since 1982–83 (also the last time the Tribe won 20 games in a season). Even though the Tribe received the #2 seed for the 1998 CAA men's basketball tournament, they lost to American in the quarterfinals  and were not invited to a post-season tournament.

Program notes
Charlie Woollum was named CAA Coach of the Year, the first William & Mary coach to win the award since Bruce Parkhill in 1983.
Randy Bracy was named to the First Team All-CAA, and Terence Jennings was named to the Second Team.

Schedule

|-
!colspan=9 style="background:#006400; color:#FFD700;"| Regular season

|-
!colspan=9 style="background:#006400; color:#FFD700;"| 1998 CAA Men's Basketball Tournament

Source

References

William and Mary Tribe
William & Mary Tribe men's basketball seasons
William and Mary Tribe Men's Basketball
William and Mary Tribe Men's Basketball